Motorola X8 Mobile Computing System is a chipset from Motorola for Android-based smartphones, based on Qualcomm Snapdragon System on a chip S4 Pro. CPU of S4 Pro is ARM-compatible dual-core Krait, and GPU of this chip is 4-core Adreno 320. Several low-power DSP chips were added by Motorola to S4 Pro in the chipset to process audio and inputs from other sensors.

Composition
 Qualcomm Snapdragon S4 Pro SoC (MSM8960, DT version), built with 28 nm process node, with:
 1.7 GHz dual-core ARM-compatible Krait processor
 quad-core Adreno 320 GPU
 natural language processor - single-core
 contextual awareness processor - single-core

Loaded smartphones
 Motorola Droid Ultra
 Motorola Droid Maxx
 Motorola Droid Mini
 Motorola Moto X

References

External links
 Motorola X8 Mobile Computing System official website (Archived)
 Motorola's 'X8 Computing System', Brought To You By Qualcomm And Texas Instruments? // Forbes, 2013-08-28

Computer-related introductions in 2013
ARM-based systems on chips
Embedded microprocessors
Motorola products
Qualcomm
System on a chip